This is a list of notable fictional television stations, including fictional television networks.

United States local stations

Canal Ocho (Channel 8) – Springfield Spanish language station where Bumblebee Man works in The Simpsons
Channel 3 (News 3) – Royal Woods, Michigan station in The Loud House
Channel 4 Houston, Texas, where Melvin P. Thorpe launches his crusade against The Best Little Whorehouse in Texas   
Channel 5 
Public access channel on Tim and Eric Awesome Show Great Job and Check It Out! with Dr. Steve Brule. Located in Los Angeles, California, as seen in the Tim and Eric Awesome Show Great Job episode "Choices".
Family Guy News station in Quahog, Rhode Island with anchors Tom Tucker, and Diane Simmons.
 Channel 6  
Los Angeles News/Sports station in the Nickelodeon sitcoms Sam & Cat and Victorious.
New York City station where April O'Neil worked in Teenage Mutant Ninja Turtles
Springfield news station where Kent Brockman works in The Simpsons
 Channel 6 ½ – The setting for a series of comedic sketches in the Nickelodeon variety show All That.
 Channel 7 (7 News) – Philadelphia TV station in the 1996 film Up Close and Personal 
 Channel 8 
Minneapolis, Minnesota station in The Mary Tyler Moore Show episode WJM Tries Harder
 San Francisco, California station where Danny Tanner and Rebecca Donaldson Katsopolis worked in Full House.
 Local TV station run by R.J. Fletcher in the 1989 film UHF
 Channel 9 (Westview 9) – Westview, New Jersey news station in the WandaVision episode Breaking the Fourth Wall. 
Channel 10 (Cable 10) – Aurora, Illinois station seen in the films Wayne's World (1992) & Wayne's World 2 (1993) as well as the Wayne's World comedic sketches on the NBC variety show Saturday Night Live
Channel 11 (Tough 11) – Royal Woods, Michigan station in The Loud House
 Channel 54 (Cable 54) – Los Angeles, California station in the 1988 film They Live.
 Channel 84 – Local TV station on the animated sitcom King of the Hill. Located in the fictional city of Arlen, Texas. Is definitely not a Fox station, as Fox is blocked in the Hill family's house, and they still watch channel 84. The UHF band never went as high as 84, only as high as 83.
 HTS (Houston Television Service) - Houston, Texas news channel in Space Brothers.
 KBEX-TV (in film)
 Dawn of the Dead (as a Milwaukee TV station)
 Moving Violation
 Runaway
 KBEX-TV (in television)
 Barnaby Jones
 Brady Bunch
 Cannon (in "Perfect Fit For A Frame")
 Charlie's Angels (as TV and radio)
 Columbo (Season 2, Episode 6)
 Crazy Like a Fox (Channel 6, San Francisco)
 Dante's Peak (Channel 5)
 Emergency!
 Here's Lucy (in "Milton Berle is the Life of the Party")
 MacGyver (as TV and radio)
 Mannix
 Mission: Impossible
 The Rockford Files (in "The No-Cut Contract")
 Starsky & Hutch
 The Streets of San Francisco (in "Flags of Terror")
 $weepstake$ (Channel 6, Hollywood) 
 Walker, Texas Ranger
 What's Happening!!
 KCSF (Channel 8) – San Francisco TV station in Charmed heavily featured in the Season 3 finale
 KDAJ (Channel 10) – Los Angeles area TV station seen in episodes of She-Hulk: Attorney at Law 
 KEJH (Channel 3) - Los Angeles TV station in Mr. Mayor
 KEVW3 (Channel 3) - Local TV station in the 1997 film Dante's Peak
 KFLW-TV (Channel 14) – seen in Die Hard
 KFPB (Channel 8) -  is a Los Angeles television station in The Fresh Prince of Bel-Air
 KFUK (Phoenix, Arizona, Channel 7) – Used Cars
 KFVD (Odessa, Texas) – Heroes
 KGGY (Channel 8) – Denver, Colorado station in the 1991 Perry Mason TV movie The Case of the Ruthless Reporter
 KGIM 
Boise, Idaho station in the 1976 film Network 
Dallas, Texas station in Dallas (original TV series)
 KGOD (Channel 17, formerly KRUD) – The setting of the 1980 film Pray TV
 KIKA (Channel 13) – San Francisco TV station used in the Monk episode "Mr. Monk and the TV Star", first aired on January 30, 2004
 KKGB - a local Boulder TV station appeared in the Mork & Mindy episode "Looney Tunes and Morkie Melodies"
 KLMN - a local TV station appeared in the Scooby-Doo, Where Are You! episode "Don't Fool with a Phantom"
 KLMV/ KTMV – (Channel 6), San Francisco TV station in Charmed 
 KLVY (Channel 7) - is a television station in Henry Danger
 KMAB (Channel 10) – San Francisco TV station in Charmed episode "That Old Black Magic"
 KMUP: - Station run by the Muppets in Muppets Tonight
 KNBS (News 6) – Los Angeles area TV station in the She-Hulk: Attorney at Law episode The People vs. Emil Blonsky
 KNCW (Channel 3) – Los Angeles TV station in The Great Los Angeles Earthquake
 KNKW (Channel 12) – Los Angeles TV station in D-War
 KNRG – Los Angeles TV station used in Alien Nation: The Enemy Within, first aired November 12, 1995 
 KNSB – Los Angeles TV station used in Columbo episode "Candidate for a Crime", first aired on November 4, 1973
 KPOV – Seattle, Washington, mentioned on Frasier in the episode "Frasier's Curse", first aired on October 1, 1998
 KPVK (Channel 15) – "Action News" station in the She-Hulk: Attorney at Law episode Superhuman Law
 KQRZ (Channel 4) – Los Angeles station on the TV show Adam-12 episode "Pickup", originally aired December 29, 1971
 KRLH Los Angeles station.
24 Channel 19
Any Given Sunday Channel 8
 KQSF (Channel 3) – San Francisco TV station in Charmed 
 KRKW – "Action News" station in The Stand (1994 TV mini-series)
 KSFF (channel 6) – in the Monk episode "Mr. Monk and the Man Who Shot Santa Claus"
 KSPC – (Channel 4) South Park, Colorado NBC affiliate in episode "Le Petit Tourette".
 KSXP (Channel 2) – Sacramento, California station featured in the movie The Ugly Truth
 KTGP (Channel 8) – Los Angeles station in Skyline
 KTML (Channel 6) – Pines Valley, Colorado station in Terror in the Mall
 KTNS (Kansas City, Missouri) – Network
 KTNS-31 - a local Independent TV Station in Boulder appeared in the Mork & Mindy episode "Mindy Gets Her Job" and other multiple episodes over Season 3/4
 KVKC (Channel 4) – Las Vegas, Nevada station which was featured in CSI: Crime Scene Investigation episode "Dead Air", originally aired January 16, 2013
 KVWN (Channel 4) – San Diego, California station featured in the 2004 film Anchorman: The Legend of Ron Burgundy
 KWAP (Channel 3) – Los Angeles, California station in the Remington Steele episode Steele in the News
 KWAT (Channel 8) – Seattle, Washington news station seen in the iCarly episodes iBelieve In Bigfoot, iFight Shelby Marx, and iRue the Day.
 KXIU - California station seen in the episode "Old Scrapmouth" of The Partridge Family.
 KXIW – Los Angeles station seen in several episodes of The Monkees (in some episodes as KXIU) and at least one episode of Gidget (both produced by Columbia Pictures' TV subsidiary Screen Gems) and the movie Kill the Umpire.
 KXLA (Channel 3) — Los Angeles station in The China Syndrome. (A real station with these call letters exists in the Los Angeles market on channel 44.)
 KYPN (Channel 2) — A fictional news channel in the film Into the Storm
 KZRE (Channel 5) - Seattle, Washington station seen in Ghost Whisperer.
 KZYO (Channel 12) – Local TV station in the She-Hulk: Attorney at Law episode Superhuman Law
 Metro News 1 - a low-budget news station and recurrent location of How I Met Your Mother.
 News Los Angeles Now – Los Angeles area news station seen in episodes of She-Hulk: Attorney at Law
 TRS-TV (Channel 5) – television station seen in the "No Mercy" level of Left 4 Dead
 U62 (Channel 62) – The setting of the 1989 film UHF
 WATP - Chicago, Illinois station in Jack Reed: Death and Vengeance
 WBFL - Buffalo, New York station featured in Buffalo Bill (a real station with this callsign exists in Valdosta, Georgia)
 WBOR - Muncie, Indiana station in Garfield Goes Hollywood
 WCGG – Atlanta, Georgia station in the 1976 film Network
 WDCN (Channel 8)– Washington, D.C. station in Scary Movie 3
 WDHB – Kingston Falls station in the 1984 film Gremlins
 WEBG – Starling City station in Arrow; Gotham City station in Gotham
 WEBV - Seen in Castle Rock
 WGBN (Channel 33) - Newnan, Georgia station in Silent Victim
 WGDM (Channel 8) - Boston station featured in Godmothered
 WGJZ – Washington, D.C. station in the NCIS episode House Rules
 WGNI (Channel 4) – in Resident Evil: Apocalypse
 WGVO  –  Tampa, Florida station in Greenland
 WIDF (Channel 12) – New York City station in Godzilla
 WJM-TV (Channel 12) – Minneapolis, Minnesota station featured in The Mary Tyler Moore Show
 WKJH –  in Ed McBain's 87th Precinct: Heatwave
 WKS 
Columbus, Ohio PBS station where Steven Keaton worked in Family Ties
 Minneapolis, Minnesota station in The Mary Tyler Moore Show episode Party Is Such Sweet Sorrow
 Local TV station in the Mission: Impossible episode Takeover
WLDH – Royal Woods, Michigan station in The Loud House
WLUK – station namedropped on the Missouri Lottery game show Fun & Fortune, stated as broadcasting from Luckytown (a real station with this callsign exists in Green Bay, Wisconsin)
 WMIA (9 News) – Mami, Florida station in the 1996 film Up Close and Personal 
 WMNY (Channel 8) – New York City station in Spider-Man 3
 WNMZ (Channel 4) - Boston station in the Godmothered
 WNDY – the setting for the TV drama WIOU (a real station with this call-sign exists in Indianapolis, Indiana)
 WNKW 
 Chicago, Illinois station seen in How I Met Your Mother 
 Gotham City station seen In some Batman stories; WNKW is the NBC affiliate for Gotham City
 Washington, D.C. news station in Madam Secretary 
 WNYW (Channel 5)  – a fictional television station which was shown in the Futurama season one episode When Aliens Attack (The real life television station is in New York City)
 WOHN (Channel 8) – Lima, Ohio station seen in Glee
 WPBH (Channel 9) – the TV station in Pittsburgh that Bill Murray worked as a weatherman for in the movie Groundhog Day (1993)
 WPBS-TV (Channel 13) – New York City station in National Lampoons "Precious Broadcasting Service", a parody of PBS (a real station with this callsign exists in Watertown, New York)
 WPIV 
(Channel 3) – Charleston, South Carolina affiliate of the fictional RBS network in Special Bulletin; reference to WCIV, then the NBC affiliate in Charleston
 (Channel 8) – Vermont TV station featured in Newhart
 WPIXL-TV – Pixley TV station seen and heard in Green Acres, co-owned with WPIXL radio
 WPLP - Milwaukee, Wisconsin station seen in A Whole New Ballgame
 WQHG (Channel 5) – Quahog, Rhode Island station in Family Guy
 WQPB (Channel 24) - television station in Ordinary Joe
 WSVD
Grandview, New York station in Ghost Whisperer
 (Channel 7)  – Boston station in Knowing
 WTRL (Channel 3) – New York City station seen in Teenage Mutant Ninja Turtles and its sequel Teenage Mutant Ninja Turtles II: The Secret of the Ooze
 WTTQ (Channel 10) – television station in Riverside in Left 4 Dead; its existence is revealed by a news van seen in the town
 WTVH Buffalo (Channel 5) – cross-town rival of WKBW-TV 7 Buffalo, New York in Bruce Almighty (2003) (a real station with this callsign and channel number exists in Syracuse, New York)
 WURG-TV (News 9) – Pittsburgh news station and main setting in the FOX sitcom Back to You
 WUSA – New Orleans TV station in the 1970 film WUSA (a real station with this callsign exists in Washington, D.C.) 
 WWED (Channel 3) – New York City station in Final Destination 2
 WXIU-TV – TV station seen in Close Encounters of the Third Kind and the TV series  Hazel (in "Campaign Manager") and Bewitched (in "Remember the Main", s1/ep34 1965, and "A Very Special Delivery", s2/ep02) and Dennis the Menace (in "Dennis, the Campaign Manager" , S2 E15)
 WXT (Channel 10)  - New York City station on the TV show Law & Order: Special Victims Unit episode "October Surprise", originally aired October 23, 2013
 WYBS (Channel 6) - Local TV station in Murder Live!
 WYN-TV (Channel 11) - Boston, Massachusetts station seen in Goodnight, Beantown
 WZAB (Channel 3)  - Valdosta, Georgia station where reporter Cindy Swanson worked in the 1998 film Ernest in the Army
 WZAZ (in film)
 The Big Bus, call sign on side of news reporter's station wagon and reporter's camera at the bus terminal's front doors filming passengers
 WZAZ (in television)
 One Day At A Time Indianapolis (in "Peabody's War")
 The Andy Griffith Show channel 12 TV station (in "The Mayberry Chef") 
 Happy Days (in "Fonzie Loves Pinky (Part 1)" and Weezer's Happy Days music video, "Buddy Holly")
WZDC-TV – TV station seen in Die Hard 2 (a real station with this callsign exists in Washington, D.C.)
Zaka TV (Channel 51) – Chicago, Illinois TV station in Michigan: Report from Hell

United States networks
  Television Network – Futurama
 AAN (All American Network) – Heroman
 ABS – F Is for Family
 ABX – Roseanne
 ACN (Atlantis Cable Network) – a fictional news channel on the American HBO drama television series The Newsroom
 Americana – a fictional TV network on which Daphne Blake's series Coast To Coast with Daphne Blake aired in the movie Scooby Doo on Zombie Island
 AMNN (AMN Network) – Doctor Who
 Animal World Channel (AWC) - a television channel that broadcasts animal-related shows seen in The Simpsons episode "Hardly Kirk-ing"
 ARN (America's Reporter Network) – Skyscraper
 ATN News Channel (American Television Network) – a fictional news channel on the American HBO drama television series Succession
 BBN (Bikini Bottom News) – SpongeBob SquarePants
 BDN (Broadcast of Digital Networks) – Babylon
 BFN (Broadcasting Frontline Network) – GR: Giant Robo
 Cartoon Central – a mashup of Cartoon Network and Comedy Central seen in the South Park episode "Death"
 CBC Network (Christian Broadcasting Channel) - a Christian television network seen in the South Park episode "Starvin' Marvin in Space"
 CCN (Clamp Cable Network) – Gremlins 2: The New Batch
 CDE (spoof of ABC) – The Muppets
 Channel 4 News - a popular news cable television network from South Park
 Channel 326 - a Pay-per-view sports channel featured in the iCarly two-part special episode iFight Shelby Marx
 Channel Umptee-3
 CNNBCBS (A division of ABC) – The Simpsons
 CNT (Conglomerated National Television) - television network in Grand Theft Auto IV and Grand Theft Auto V; a parody of TNT and ABC.
 Country and Wenceslas - a country music channel seen in The Simpsons episode "I Won't Be Home for Christmas"
 CSC (Continental Sports Channel) – an ESPN-style cable sports channel on the sitcom Sports Night.
 CTN News – The Powerpuff Girls Movie
 DBC – Ultimate Spider-Man
 Dingo Channel - a Teen/Kids oriented network and a parody of Disney Channel in the iCarly episodes iBattle Chip, iTake on Dingo, and iToe Fat Cakes
 EBC (Emergency Broadcasting Channel) – used in the Johnny Test episode "JTV"; also used as the name for the channel that cable systems use to show EBS and weather alerts
 ƎNN (Eminem News Network) - a parody of CNN seen in the Eminem music video Without Me
 ENN World Network - a television network seen in Resident Evil: Vendetta
 ESBN - a sports television network and a parody of ESPN seen in The Simpsons episode "22 for 30"
 ESPN 8 – a.k.a. "The Ocho" (DodgeBall: A True Underdog Story)
 Estrogen Network  a television channel exclusive for female audiences seen in The Simpsons episode "Bye, Bye, Nerdie"
 Fashion Television (later renamed Fashion Buzz likely to reduce confusion with the actual Canadian series of the same name) – a cable channel featured in Ugly Betty
 Federal Broadcasting Network – The setting for the 1957 film Desk Set
 Ferb TV - Phineas and Ferb create a cable station which features many TV shows that parody real shows. 
 Fright TV - The Loud House, it features Lucy's favorite show Vampires of Melancholia in the episode "Fandom Pains".
 FUX NEWS 5 – News station seen in "Teenagers from Uranus: Sloppy Seconds" (2006) and a parody of Fox News Channel.
 FXXX - a parody of FXX seen in The Simpsons episode Simpsorama
 FXXXXXX - a parody of FXX seen in The Simpsons special halloween-themed episode "Treehouse of Horror XXV"
 Galaxy Broadcasting System (GBS) – a television network in various Superman stories by DC Comics
 GNN
 CNN-style news outlet in the 1996 TV movie Special Report: Journey to Mars
 The setting of the 2013 film Anchorman 2: The Legend Continues
 Galaxy News Network, a fictional pre-Great War television station in the video game series Fallout
 Global Network News, a fictional news network in Vantage Point 
 Gotham News Network (GNN) – seen in Christopher Nolan Batman films Batman Begins and The Dark Night; a rival station is also seen in some scenes, GCN (Gotham City News)
 HBC – South Park
 HB News - a news channel seen in Scooby-Doo! Mask of the Blue Falcon
 HBOWTIME - a premium cable television network and a parody of HBO and Showtime seen in The Simpsons episode The Ten-Per-Cent Solution
 HBTV (Hanna-Barbera Television) - TV station seen in A Pup Named Scooby-Doo episode "For Letter or Worse".
 The Heartmark Channel - a TV channel that produces original films, appears in The Simpsons episode A Springfield Summer Christmas for Christmas and is a parody of Hallmark Channel
 HG Cooking Channel - a Cooking show channel seen in the iCarly episode iLost My Mind.
 Hip Hop Hosannas - a hip hop music channel seen in The Simpsons episode "I Won't Be Home for Christmas"
 IBC – Scrooged
 IBS – Morning Glory
 ICS – The Running Man
 Impulse Buying Network - a home shopping channel seen in The Simpsons episode Lady Bouvier's Lover
 Interstellar Network News – Babylon 5
 J&G Shopping Network - a home shopping channel seen in the South Park episodes Cash For Gold, A Scause For Applause, Hummels & Heroin and Basic Cable
 Kidnet - a kids' TV channel from Death to Smoochy
 The Kid-Tacular Kids Channel - a kids' TV channel from Codename: Kids Next Door episodes Operation: C.A.B.L.E.-T.V. and Operation: C.O.L.L.E.G.E.
 LSBC - Grand Theft Auto: San Andreas
 MBC – The Ratings Game
 MMN - a fictional cable news and the main setting of Great News 
 NBS
 Married With Children
 Studio 60 on the Sunset Strip
 Network 23 – Max Headroom
 News Net (NN)  – cable network in The Second Civil War (a real, free-to-air American television network with a similar name, NewsNet, exists)
 National News Channel (NNC) - cable news network in For All Mankind 
 NNT Channel - a Cable TV network in Ghost Whisperer.
 NTV – a TV channel in the segment from Sesame Street; a parody of MTV
 Norwegian Death Metal Holiday Hymns - a channel that features death metal music from Norway seen in The Simpsons episode "I Won't Be Home for Christmas"
 Public Broadcasting Corporation (PBC) - Grand Theft Auto IV; is a parody of ABC, BBC, RTÉ, CBC and PBS
 PGM (Pierce Global Media) – a fictional news channel on the American HBO drama television series Succession
 PTV – Peter Griffin's TV network from a Family Guy episode of the same name
 Puppet Television Network - the main TV network from 2018 black comedy film The Happytime Murders
 Q-USA – pirate television station in the comic book American Flagg!
 Racing Sports Network – in Cars and Cars 3; a parody of Speed, Fox Sports, and ESPN
 RBS – Special Bulletin
 RBTV (Really Bad Television) - The Adventures of Rocky and Bullwinkle (film)
 Rerunland - a television channel seen in The Simpsons episode "The Girl Who Slept Too Little"
 Satellite News Network (SNN) - a fictitious cable TV news channel from Switching Channels
SENN (Southeast News Network) - network on The Morning Show
 Sporty Penguin Entertainment Network (SPEN)  – Surf's Up
 Sunshine Network - a Christian television network from upcoming Filthy Rich TV series (a real network with this name existed until 2002)
 SSSN (Super Secret Spy Network) – Phineas and Ferb
 S-SPAN - an American pay television channel run by the federal government and a parody of C-SPAN seen in The Simpsons episode "Opposites A-Frack"
 Testosterone Network - a television channel exclusive for male audiences seen in The Simpsons episodes "Bart vs. Lisa vs. the Third Grade" and "I, (Annoyed Grunt)-bot"
 The Comedy Cable Channel - a parody of Comedy Central seen in The Simpsons episode Clown in the Dumps
 The Chew Network - an American premium cable network about food seen in The Simpsons episode "'Cue Detective"
 The Learning Network - a parody of Discovery Channel and TLC seen in The Simpsons episode Frink Gets Testy
 The Vintage Network - a classic television network seen in the iCarly episode iToe Fat Cakes.
 The Warner Brothers Network - a parody of Warner Bros. and The WB Television Network seen in The Simpsons episode Lisa's Sax
 Top Hat Channel - an adult channel seen in The Simpsons episode "Homer vs. Lisa and the 8th Commandment"
 Tube Town - a TV channel specialized in reruns of classic sitcoms and a parody of TV Land seen in The Simpsons episode "Homer the Father"
TVS (TVS Records) –  a parody of CBS in the iCarly episode iCarly Saves TV.
UBA (United Broadcast Association) - network that airs The Morning Show morning news program on The Morning Show
 UBC – The Barefoot Executive
 UBN – Dead Rising: Watchtower
 UBS – The setting of the Norman Lear sitcom America 2-Night; a parody of CBS
 UFO HD - an alien television channel seen in The Simpsons episode "The Man Who Came to Be Dinner"
 UIC Network – Archie Comics
 Union Broadcasting System(s) (UBS) – the setting of the 1976 film Network (once referred to as "UBS TV")
 VBC (Vice Broadcasting Channel) - used in Grand Theft Auto: Vice City; a parody of CBS.
 VBS (The Vice Broadcasting Service) - used in Grand Theft Auto: Vice City; a parody of NBC.
Video Game Channel - an Esports network featured in the iCarly episode iStage An Intervention.
 WBC (World Broadcasting Corporation) – news network in Rampage 2: Universal Tour and Rampage Through Time.
 WZL (Weazel) - television channel in Grand Theft Auto: Vice City, Grand Theft Auto: San Andreas, Grand Theft Auto: Liberty City Stories, Grand Theft Auto IV, Grand Theft Auto: The Lost and Damned, Grand Theft Auto: The Ballad of Gay Tony, Grand Theft Auto: Chinatown Wars, Grand Theft Auto V and Grand Theft Auto Online; a parody of NBC, CBS, Fox and The CW.
 Weazel News – a news channel in Grand Theft Auto: Liberty City Stories, Grand Theft Auto IV and Grand Theft Auto V; a parody of BBC News, BBC News Channel, BBC World News, Al Jazeera English and Fox News Channel
 WHIH World News - a recurring news network in the Marvel Cinematic Universe
The Incredible Hulk
Iron Man 2
Agents of S.H.I.E.L.D.
Daredevil
WHIH Newsfront
Jessica Jones
Luke Cage
Iron Fist
Inhumans
The Punisher
Runaways
WandaVision
The Falcon and the Winter Soldier
Black Widow
Eternals
 WNN 
 Fictional news outlet in the 1998 film Apocalypse
 CNN-style news network in Skybound.
 Weather News Network  – Cloudy with a Chance of Meatballs
 World News Network  – Love Wrecked and The Happening
 World Wide News – How I Met Your Mother
 XTZ TV – used in the Diana Ross music video Chain Reaction
 Yum! Network – A Food Network style channel in The Loud House
 ZNN – a CNN-style news network, first seen in the second season of JAG; ZNN also appears in Hawaii Five-0, NCIS, Seven Days, Blackout 2018 (Syfy) and Zootopia

United Kingdom
Aronovitz Business News, ESN News, Film and Movie News, GO Sports 1, IBS News, and several other parodies of news channels – Broken News
Chanel 9 – a TV station from the fictional island dictatorship of Republicca featured in The Fast Show
 BBC 3 TV - A fictional channel seen in the Doctor Who serial "The Daemons"; and another unrelated channel that supposedly broadcast Roland Rat: The Series; both decades before the creation of the real BBC Three.
 BBC 12 - A fictional channel seen in 2001: A Space Odyssey, with an ident based on the contemporary BBC 2 logo.
BNN – A fictional news station in the film Quantum Apocalypse and King of Thorn
DDC News – A parody of BBC News used in Diddy Movies, Diddy TV and the Danger Mouse reboot series
Diddy TV (Channel 6597423) - Diddy Dick and Dom's very own TV station
EBC1 – in Emu's Broadcasting Company, a children's TV show 1975–80
GBB (Global British Broadcasting) - a national television broadcaster in Watch Dogs Legion 
GBBN - Hero Mask
GBTV - a fictional news channel featured in The Core (a real online news channel with the same name existed in the United States from 2011-2012).
HHTV (Horrible Histories Television) - Horrible Histories
KYTV – KYTV
Network 7 – a fictional satellite network used for a groundbreaking Channel 4 youth news programme
Network Six – a role-playing game with regional television areas
Outer Hebrides Broadcasting Corporation – a small-scale TV station in the Outer Hebrides, whose programmes are all performed by a single person named Highlander Angus in a small hut; featured in Naked Video
PPC TV (Channel 2 ½) - a TV station from Pinky and Perky
Rutland Weekend Television – a 1970s sketch show written by Eric Idle; RWT was the United Kingdom's smallest television station for the country's smallest county
Troutbridge TV – a television station in Portsmouth that was the setting for The TV Lark, effectively the fifth series of The Navy Lark
UKN - a fictional news channel in Black Mirror
UNN (UK News Network) - Eve
VBBC – parody of BBC One and name parodying CBBC, seen in Phineas and Ferb
W&G TV - Wallace and Gromit's World of Invention

Other countries

Antarctica
Antarctica Television – spoof channel

Argentina
Mega News – Los Exitosos Pells
M Noticias – Los Exitosos Pells

Brazil
INC (International News Conglomerate) - a fictional TV network in the 2012 video game Max Payne 3
Parker TV - a fictional cable network from 2014 Brazilian telenovela Now Generation
PopTV - a fictional TV network from 2019 Brazilian telenovela Verão 90 and a parody of MTV Brasil
SPBC TV - a fictional São Paulo TV station in the 2012 video game Max Payne 3
TV Mundial - a fictional TV network in the 2017 Brazilian film Bingo: The King of the Mornings and parody of Rede Globo
TV Salt Cover – a parody of Rede Globo on YouTube
TVP - a fictional TV network in the 2017 Brazilian film Bingo: The King of the Mornings and parody of SBT

Canada
The Canada Channel – appears on the South Park episode "Eat, Pray, Queef"
CFCE (Channel 12)  – Montreal TV station in movie Keeping Track, based on real station CFCF-TV.
CIVIC-TV (UHF Channel 83/Cable channel 12): in the film Videodrome, a Toronto UHF station, likely a reference to real station CITY-TV.
CRQC (Channel 3)  – Montreal TV station in Urban Angel.
CTLS (Channel 10)  – for the Canadian TV series E.N.G., the Toronto station where the characters work on the news program.
Météo+ –  Francophone cable weather channel based in Sudbury, Ontario, in the Canadian TV series Météo+
SCTV – for Second City Television, the titular local television station, later network, in the fictional town of Melonville

China
8TV – Hong Kong TV station in One Second Champion
APTV (All People Television) – Hong Kong TV station in Over Run Over
Daddy TV – Hong Kong TV station in Come On, Cousin
HKTV – Hong Kong TV station in Happy Together
HKWN (Hong Kong World News) – Hong Kong news channel in Skyscraper
Kowloon TV – Hong Kong TV station in JoJo's Bizarre Adventure
TNN (Television Network News) – Hong Kong news channel in Big White Duel and Big White Duel 2
TVI (Television International) – Hong Kong TV station in Come Home Love: Dinner at 8
TV News Shanghai – Miraculous: Tales of Ladybug and Cat Noir

France
FR1 – TV station in King of Thorn
Kidz+ – a children's television network seen in Miraculous: Tales of Ladybug and Cat Noir
TVi – A fictional counterpart of TF1 in the series Miraculous: Tales of Ladybug and Cat Noir
VTF (Video Tele France) – seen in the 1980 film Superman II

Indonesia
OKTV – a TV station based in Jakarta from sitcom OB (Office Boy)

International waters
WRAB – off-shore TV station in the Matt Howarth graphic novel WRAB: Pirate Television

Italy
TVR 24 – a TV channel in Rome seen in the 2003 film The Core

Japan
ABG News - Futari wa Pretty Cure Episode 2.
ANNN – Sailor Moon episode "Sailor V Makes the Scene. Enter Venus, the Last Sailor Guardian"
APC (Channel 10) – Time of Eve
Asakusa Sara TV (浅草皿電視台) – Sarazanmai
BNN – Sailor Moon R episode "Defeat Rubeus: The Battle in Space"
Delta TV – Library War
EJT (東日本TV; East Japan TV) – Asobi no jikan wa owaranai
FQX - Excel Saga
Ginga TV (銀河TV; Galaxy TV) – Tokyo headquarters of Shadow Galactica in Sailor Moon Sailor Stars 
HBS – Ghost Sweeper Mikami Episode 4 "Ghost Sweeper in Space"
JBC – Noragami
JWNN – Parasite Dolls
Kanto TV (関東TV) – Blue Seed
KNN – Terror in Resonance
KTV (Home of the Digital Puppet News Team) – seen in The Simpsons episode "Thirty Minutes Over Tokyo"
Nichiuri TV (日売TV) – Case Closed
TLS (Tokyo Location Services) – Before We Vanish
TVA – Sailor Moon episode 	"So You Want to Be a Superstar". 
TV Okutokyo (TV奥東京) – Keroro Gunso

Malaysia
CH6 - an Islamic TV station based in Kota Kinabalu
New China News (新华人新闻台) - a News channel in The Leakers
P-HD - a TV station based in Johor Bahru from Network 10 in Australia

Mexico
 Global News – in the TV series Los Exitosos Perez
 RS News – in the TV series Los Exitosos Perez
TVMX – La dictadura perfecta

Romania
TVTV (Transylvanian Television) - used in the Count Duckula episode, "Prime-Time Duck".

Singapore
ABC-ZNN - Equivalent of real-world television channel ABS-CBN, featured in the Singaporean animated series Trese

South Korea
EATV in The Terror Live
SNC in The Terror Live

Vietnam
THFFFVN (Truyen Hinh Fun Fun Fun Viet Nam) – from episode 12 of STB comedy

Fictional or extinct places

Bedrock
CNN (Cave News Network) - a Stone Age counterpart of CNN seen in the 1994 film The Flintstones

Boiling Isles
BBN/HXN – The Owl House

Outer space
 Channel 27, also known as "Funky, Groovy Channel 27" in Red Dwarf
 FNN (Federation News Network) – a CNN-style news outlet seen in episodes of Star Trek: Lower Decks and Star Trek: Picard

Pangaea
DNN (Dinosaur News Network) - a cable news network in the TV series Dinosaurs

Two Point County
TPCNN (Two Point County News Network) - a news network in the video game Two Point Hospital

See also
 List of fictional radio stations

References

Television stations